David Saad (born 1954) is a Lebanese judoka. He competed in the men's lightweight event at the 1976 Summer Olympics.

Biography
Saad studied computer science in which he had a DEUG from University of Paris-Sud, BSc from Concordia University, MSc.A. from McGill University and PhD from University of Paris-Sud.

His younger brother Gad Saad is a Lebanese-Canadian evolutionary behavioural scientist at the John Molson School of Business. His nephew is Ariel Helwani who is a Canadian mixed martial arts (MMA) journalist.

References

1954 births
Living people
Lebanese Jews
Lebanese male judoka
Olympic judoka of Lebanon
Judoka at the 1976 Summer Olympics
Place of birth missing (living people)
Paris-Sud University alumni
Concordia University alumni
McGill University alumni